Arthur Nicholls may refer to:

Arthur Bell Nicholls (1819–1906), curate to Patrick Brontë, and husband of Patrick's daughter Charlotte Brontë
Arthur Nicholls (British Army officer) (1911–1944), British recipients of the George Cross
Arthur G. Nicholls (1879–1956), Australian medical missionary